Saumur is a commune in the Maine-et-Loire department in western France.

The town is located between the Loire and Thouet rivers, and is surrounded by the vineyards of Saumur itself, Chinon, Bourgueil, Coteaux du Layon, etc.. Saumur station has rail connections to Tours, Angers, La Roche-sur-Yon and Nantes.

Toponymy
First attested in the Medieval Latin form of Salmuri in 968 AD, the origin of the name is obscure. Albert Dauzat hypothesized a pre-Celtic unattested element *sala 'marshy ground' (cf. Celtic salm 'which jumps and flows'), followed by another unattested element meaning "wall". Many places in Europe seem to contain *Sal(m)- elements, which may share Old European roots.

History
The Dolmen de Bagneux on the south of the town, is 23 meters long and is built from 15 large slabs of the local stone, weighing over 500 tons. It is the largest in France.

The Château de Saumur was constructed in the 10th century to protect the Loire River crossing from Norman attacks after the settlement of Saumur was sacked in 845. The castle, destroyed in 1067 and inherited by the House of Plantagenet, was rebuilt by Henry II of England in the later 12th century. It changed hands several times between Anjou and France until 1589.

Houses in Saumur are constructed almost exclusively of Tuffeau stone. The caves dug to excavate the stone are now often used as commercial wine cellars.

Amyraldism, or the School of Saumur, is a distinctive form of Reformed theology taught by Moses Amyraut at the University of Saumur in the 17th century. Saumur is also the scene for Balzac's novel Eugénie Grandet, written in 1833.

Saumur was the location of the Battle of Saumur during the Revolt in the Vendée. It hosted a state prison under Napoleon. The town was an equestrian centre with both the military cavalry school from 1783 and later the Cadre Noir equestrian team.

World War II

During the Battle of France in World War II, Saumur was the site of the Battle of Saumur (1940); the town and south bank of the Loire were defended by the teenage cadets of the cavalry school.

In 1944 it was the target of the first Tallboy and the fourth Azon bombing raids by Allied planes. On 8/9 June 1944,  Tallboy "earthquake" bombs were first used, against a railway tunnel near Saumur. The hastily organized night raid was to stop a planned German Panzer Division, travelling to engage the newly landed allied forces in Normandy. The panzers were expected to use the railway to cross the Loire. They hit the approaches to the bridge, blocked the railway cutting and one pierced the roof of the tunnel, bringing down a huge quantity of rock and soil which blocked the tunnel, badly delaying the German reinforcements moving towards Normandy, especially 2nd SS Panzer Division Das Reich. The damaged tunnel was quickly dug out to make a deeper cutting, resulting in the need for a second attack.

On 22 June, nine Consolidated B-24 Liberators of the United States Army Air Forces used the new Azon  glide bombs against the Saumur rail bridge;  escorted by 43 North American P-51 Mustangs. They failed to destroy the bridge. During the morning of 24 June, 38 American Boeing B-17 Flying Fortresses with conventional bombs attacked the bridge; escort was provided by 121 of 135 P-51s. The bridge was damaged.

The town of Saumur was awarded the Croix de Guerre with palm for its resistance and display of French patriotism during the war.

Main attractions

Saumur is home to the Cadre Noir, the École Nationale d'Équitation (National School of Horsemanship), known for its annual horse shows, as well as the Armoured Branch and Cavalry Training School, the officer school for armored forces (tanks).

There is the national tank museum, the Musée des Blindés, with more than 850 armored vehicles, wheeled or tracked.  Most of them are from France, though some come from other countries such as Brazil, Germany, and the Soviet Union, as well as axis and allied vehicles of World War Two.

The annual military Carrousel takes place in July each year, as it has done for over 160 years, with displays of horse cavalry skills, historic and modern military vehicles.

Amongst the most important monuments of Saumur are the great Château de Saumur itself which stands high above the town, and the nearby Château de Beaulieu which stands just 200 metres from the south bank of the Loire River and which was designed by the architect Jean Drapeau. A giant sequoia tree (which is protected) stands in the grounds of Château de Beaulieu. The Dolmen de Bagneux is on the old road going south.

The architectural character of the town owes much to the fact that it is constructed almost exclusively of Tuffeau stone.

The wine industry surrounds Saumur, many utilising the tunnels as cellars with the hundreds of domaines producing white, red, rosé and sparkling wines. Visits to producers and the annual Grandes Tablées du Saumur-Champigny is an annual event held in early August with over 1 km of tables set up in Saumur so people can sample the local foods and wine.

Saumur has a weekly market every Saturday morning with hundreds of stalls open for business in the streets and squares of the old town, from before 8am.

Notable people
Saumur was the birthplace of:
 Gabriel Dugrès (fl. 1643), French Huguenot grammarian
 Anne Le Fèvre Dacier (1654–1720), scholar and translator of classics
 Jeanne Delanoue (1666-1736), made a Roman Catholic Saint in 1982 
 François Bontemps (1753–1811), General of the French Revolutionary Wars
 Charles Ernest Beulé (1826–1874), archeologist
 Coco Chanel (1883–1971), fashion designer
 Marie Adrien Persac (1823–1873), Franco-American lithographer and photographer
 Yves Robert (1920–2002), actor, composer, director, writer, producer
 Jack le Goff (1931-2009), equestrian
 Fanny Ardant (b. 1949), actress
 Dominique Pinon (b. 1955), actor
 Youna Dufournet (b. 1993), French artistic gymnast

Other:
 The French mathematician Abraham de Moivre initially studied logic at Saumur.
 Marquis de Sade was briefly imprisoned in the Château de Saumur (then a prison) in 1768.
 Jehan Alain (1911-1940), organist and composer, was killed during the Battle of Saumur.

Twin towns – sister cities

Saumur is twinned with:
 Formigine, Italy
 Verden an der Aller, Germany
 Warwick, England, United Kingdom
 Asheville, North Carolina, USA

Demographics 

In 1973 Saumur absorbed four neighbouring communes. The population data for 1968 and earlier in the table and graph below refer to the pre-1973 borders.

See also

 Musée des Blindés
 Battle of Saumur (1940)

References

External links

 Official website (in French)
 Notre Dame des Ardilliers - Article in the Catholic Encyclopedia about a Catholic pilgrimage center in the town
 Tank Museum of Saumur (Musée des Blindés)
 Chateau de Beaulieu
 Les séquoias géants en Pays-de-la-Loire
 Chateau of Saumur (in French)
 Cadre Noir
 Saumur Cricket Club

Communes of Maine-et-Loire
Subprefectures in France
Anjou